Marsyas of Philippi (Ancient Greek: Μαρσύας, Κριτοφήμου, Φιλιππεύς; 3rd century BC) was a Macedonian Greek historian and the son of Critophemus. He was often called Marsyas the Younger to distinguish him from Marsyas of Pella, with whom he has frequently been confounded. The earliest writers by whom he is cited is Plinius and Athenaeus. The latter tells us that he also served as a priest of Heracles. His works were Μακεδονικά On Macedonia (6 books), Αρχαιολογία Archaeology (On Attica?) (12 books) and Μυθικά On Myths (7 books).

References
FGrHist 135/6 (Fragments).
Dictionary of Greek and Roman Biography and Mythology by William Smith (lexicographer)
Atthis: The Local Chronicles of Ancient Athens by Felix Jacoby

Hellenistic-era historians
3rd-century BC historians
Ancient Macedonian priests
Ancient Macedonian historians
Writers of lost works
3rd-century BC Macedonians
Ancient Philippians